A bronze statue of Ken Shimura was unveiled in Higashimurayama, Tokyo, Japan, in 2021.

References

2021 establishments in Japan
2021 sculptures
Buildings and structures in Tokyo
Higashimurayama, Tokyo
Monuments and memorials in Japan
Sculptures of men in Japan
Statues in Japan